Alpha Lambda Omega Christian Sorority, Incorporated is a national, inter-denominational Christian sorority founded April 9, 1990, by four students at the University of Texas at Austin. The sorority consists of 14 chapters in the states of Texas, Pennsylvania, Michigan, and Oklahoma and is governed by a national executive board in the headquarters in Houston, Texas.

History

Brothers 
The official brothers of Alpha Lambda Omega Christian Sorority are the brothers of Gamma Phi Delta Christian Fraternity, founded in 1988.

Undergraduate Chapters 
The chapters of Alpha Lambda Omega are:
Alpha Genesis- University of Texas at Austin
Beta Exodus- Prairie View A&M University
Gamma Levitcus- Texas A&M University
Delta Numbers- Sam Houston State University
Epsilon Deuteronomy- Langston University
Zeta Joshua-  Texas State University
Eta Judges-  Stephen F. Austin University
Theta Ruth- University of Texas at Arlington
Iota Samuel- University of Pittsburgh
Kappa Sammuel- Lamar University
Lambda Kings- Baylor University
Mu Kings- Texas Tech University
Nu Chronicles- Texas Southern University
Xi Chronicles- Central Michigan University
Omicron Ezra- Michigan State University
Pi Nehemiah- University of Houston

Alumni 
The chapters of Alpha Lambda Omega are:
Beaumont, TX Colony- Beaumont, Texas
Greater Houston Area Colony- Greater Houston

References

External links 
  of the national sorority

Christian fraternities and sororities in the United States
Student organizations established in 1990
1990 establishments in Texas